Real Madrid Club de Fútbol is a professional football club based in Madrid, Spain, which plays in La Liga. This chronological list comprises all those who have held the position of manager of the first team of Real Madrid from 1910, when the first professional manager was appointed, to the present day. Each manager's entry includes his dates of tenure and the club's overall competitive record (in terms of matches won, drawn and lost), major honours won and significant achievements under his leadership. Caretaker managers are included, where known. As of the start of the 2018–19 season, Real Madrid have had 40 full-time managers.

The first full-time manager for Real Madrid was Arthur Johnson. He was signed by one of the founders of Real Madrid, and then director, Adolfo Meléndez, and coached the team for ten seasons, gaining one Spanish Cup.

The most successful Real Madrid manager in terms of trophies won is Miguel Muñoz, who won nine La Liga titles, two Spanish Cups, two European Cup titles and one Intercontinental Cup in his 15-year reign as manager. He is also the club's longest-serving manager.

List of managers
The complete list of Real Madrid managers is shown in the following table:

Information correct as of the match played on 3 January 2023. Only competitive matches are counted.

Trophies

Notes
A.  Campeonato Centro matches are not counted because it was a regional championship.

B.  Win % is rounded to two decimal places.

C.  Formerly played for the club.

D.  The club's first full-time manager.

E.  The first manager to manage a Spanish club side in European competition and to win a European trophy (1955–56 European Cup).

F.  Most honours won and longest-serving manager in club history.

FIFA.  Won FIFA World Coach of the Year/The Best FIFA Football Coach while at Real Madrid.

References

 
Managers
Lists of association football managers by club in Spain
Managers